Hernán Trizano Avezzana (Valparaíso, 1860 - Temuco, 1926) was a Chilean Army officer who led the Gendarmes para las Colonias an army regiment that acted as rural police in Southern Chile. Trizano led this policing force until 1905.

See also
Banditry in Chile

References

Chilean Army officers
1860 births
1926 deaths
People from Valparaíso
Chilean military personnel of the War of the Pacific
Italian emigrants to Chile